Wish for Wings are an Australian metalcore band formed in Brisbane, Queensland in 2002.

In 2003, they released a four-track demo titled xDEMOx recorded with Adam Merker at Studio Andeers Deebers and distributed through local record shops. However, word quickly spread of the band's energetic live shows and stage presence and ticket sales soon eclipsed sales of the demo.

In 2005, the band recorded and released their debut EP, From the Past to the Grave through Washed Up Records which reached No. 10 on the AIR Independent singles chart. The band then toured Australia, New Zealand and Canada in support of the release.

Wish for Wings released their debut album, Afterlife in November, 2008.

Members
Rhys Watts - Vocals
Aido Spinks - Bass
Aaron Spinks - Guitar
Steve Kellner- Drums
Andy Barber  - Guitar

Former members
Locky Paul - Vocals
Oliver Bones - Guitar
Andy Barber - Guitar
Tynan Skinner - Drums
Todd Hansen - Drums
Shannan Waters - Drums
Tim Wedel - Drums
 Jake Beazley - Drums

Discography

References

External links
Washed Up Records
Wish for Wings MySpace
Wish For Wings Facebook

Musical groups established in 2002
Australian metalcore musical groups
Musical groups from Brisbane